Tayeb Guessoum (born March 10, 1985 in Hussein Dey, Algiers Province) is an Algerian football player. He is currently without a club.

External links
 

1985 births
Living people
People from Hussein Dey (commune)
Algerian footballers
USM Alger players
USM El Harrach players
MC Saïda players
Algeria youth international footballers
Association football midfielders
21st-century Algerian people